Mixed Messages is a single-movement composition for orchestra by the American composer Nico Muhly.  The work was commissioned by the Philadelphia Orchestra and was premiered in Philadelphia on May 13, 2015 by the Philadelphia Orchestra under the conductor Yannick Nézet-Séguin.

Composition
Mixed Messages has a duration of roughly 11 minutes and is composed in one continuous movement.

Instrumentation
The work is scored for an orchestra comprising two flutes, piccolo, two oboes, cor anglais, two clarinets, bass clarinet, two bassoons, contrabassoon, four horns, three trumpets, two tenor trombones, bass trombone, tuba, timpani, four percussionists, harp, piano (doubling celesta), and strings.

Reception
Reviewing the world premiere, David Patrick Stearns of The Philadelphia Inquirer wrote, "Muhly's Mixed Messages has an intriguing title - but there's nothing murky in this knock-out orchestral showpiece that does the work of a Berlioz overture but in 21st-century post-minimalist terms."  Stearns added, "A bedrock of propulsive rhythms enjoys playful counterpoint with whatever is unfolding on top, all orchestrated in a quasi-Rachmaninoff sound envelope. The orchestra is still wrapping its fingers around it. But Muhly has written a piece that weds dazzling invention with practical function."  Russell Platt of The New Yorker similarly described the piece as "Nico Muhly at his best" and wrote, "after beginning with a frenzied outburst in the brass, [Muhly] continually changes focus, bringing the different departments of the orchestra into conflict with each other while maintaining an unstoppable sense of forward motion."  Anthony Tommasini of The New York Times further remarked:

Conversely, John Allison of The Daily Telegraph described Muhly as a "flavour-of-the-month composer" and wrote, "[Muhly] knows how to write for big orchestral forces, but he produces empty, post-minimalist soundscapes, and there seems to be no message at all in his music."  Tim Ashley of The Guardian gave the piece a more mixed review, remarking:

References

Compositions by Nico Muhly
2015 compositions
Compositions for symphony orchestra
Music commissioned by the Philadelphia Orchestra